Piratas de Isla de la Juventud, or simply Piratas de la Isla is a baseball team in the Cuban National Series. Based in Nueva Gerona, Isla de la Juventud, the Piratas reached the Finals of the 54th Cuban National Series, remaining as runners-up.

History
In 1977, Isla de la Juventud (then called Isla de los Pinos) received the opportunity to have an independent baseball team. Before 1976, Isla de la Juventud was part of La Habana Province and therefore did not have a baseball club.

From their inception in 1977 until the mid-1990s, Isla de la Juventud was a perennial cellar-dweller in the National Series. However, since the 1998–99 season, when they took Industriales to a seventh game in the western final, they have been a playoff contender every year.

Roster

References

External links
 Infos at Juventud Rebelde website

Baseball teams in Cuba
Isla de la Juventud
Nueva Gerona
Baseball teams established in 1977
1977 establishments in Cuba